The following is a list of the Kra–Dai ethnic groups in China:

Tai and Rauz peoples
Thai (Central Thai)
Bouyei
Tai Chong ( tai chong)
Dai ( tai léu), including the Lu, Han Tai, Huayao Tai and Paxi people
Tai Dam
Dong, including the Northern and Southern Dong people
E ( ĕe)
Tai Eolai ( Tai eo laai)
Fuma ( Fū ma)
Hongjin Tai
White Thai people
Tai Kaihua ( tai kăi hŭa)
Kang
Tai Lai ( tai laai)
Minggiay ( ming-gia)
Mo
Isan people
Tai Nuea ( tai nĕua), including the Tai Mao and Tai Pong people
Pachen ( bpaa chayn)
Tai Payee ( tai bpaa yêe)
Pemiayao ( bpay-mia wor)
Pulachee ( bpoo-laa jee)
Pulungchee ( bpoo-lung-jee)
Puyai ( bpôo)
San Chay (also referred to as the Cao Lan people)
Shan (  yài tai), including the Cun
Tay
Thuchen ( dtoo chayn)
Thula ( dtù-laa)
Tai Ya people ( tai yàa)
Yoy ( tai yói)
Tay (including the Tho people)
Zhuang ( jûang), including the Buyang, Dianbao, Pusha, Tulao, Yongchun and Nùng people

Li/Hlai people
The Li/Hlai reside primarily, if not completely, within the Hainan Province of China.

Kra peoples
The Kra peoples are clustered in the Guangxi, Guizhou, Yunnan, Hunan and Hainan provinces of China, as well as the Hà Giang, Cao Bằng, Lào Cai and Sơn La provinces of Vietnam.

Kam–Sui peoples

Bouyei of Guizhou Province (including Ai-Cham, Mak and T'en, although most Bouyei are nuclear Tai)
Dong of Guizhou, Hunan and Guangxi Provinces (also referred to as the Kam people)
Mulao of Guizhou Province
Maonan of Guangxi Province
Shui of Guizhou, Yunnan and Guangxi Provinces (also referred to as the Sui people)

Cao Miao people
The Cao Miao people of Guizhou, Hunan and Guangxi Provinces speak a Kam–Sui language called Mjiuniang, although it is believed that the people are of Hmong–Mien descent.

Biao people
Whether or not the Biao people of China are of Kam–Sui descent is an issue of present debate in the scientific community.  They are, however, a Tai people.

Kang people
The Kang people of Yunnan Province (referred to as Tai Khang in Laos) speak a Kam–Sui language, but ethnically descend from the Dai people.

Biao people
The Biao people are clustered in the Guangdong Province of China.

Lakkia people
The Lakkia are an ethnic group clustered in the Guangxi Province of China and neighboring portions of Vietnam, whose members are of Yao descent, but speak a Tai–Kadai language called Lakkia. These Yao were likely in an area dominated by Tai speakers and assimilated an early Tai–Kadai language (possibly the language of the ancestors of the Biao people).

Lingao people
The Lingao people are an ethnic group clustered in the Hainan Province of China whose members are classified as  Han under China's nationality policy, but speak a Tai–Kadai language called Lincheng.

References

Ethnic groups in China